Mianwali Tehsil , is an administrative subdivision (tehsil) of Mianwali District in the Punjab province of Pakistan. The tehsil is subdivided into 2 Municipal commeties and 26 Union Councils.

History
According to the 1901 census, compiled during British rule, the population of the tehsil was 111,883 and contained 69 villages. Mianwali District is not industrial District.

Administration
The tehsil of Mianwali is administratively subdivided into  
2 Municipal Commeteis 
MC Mianwali
MC Daud Khel
and 26 Union Councils, these are: 
  Abbakhel
  Ban Hafiz Jee
  Chakrala
  Chhidru
  Paki Shah Mardan
  Dher Umid Ali Shah
  Gulmiri
  Mari Indus
  Mochh
  Musakhel
  Muzafarpur Janubi
  Muzafarpur Shumali
  Namal
  Paikhel
  Qureshian Dilay wali
  Rokhri
  Shadia
  Shahbaz Khel
  Swans
  Thamewali
  Wan Bhachran Paka Ghanjera
  Watta Khel
  Yaru Khel

References

Mianwali District
Tehsils of Punjab, Pakistan